Devinderjeet Singh Laddi Dhose is an Indian politician and the MLA representing the Dharamkot Assembly constituency in the Punjab Legislative Assembly. He is a member of the Aam Aadmi Party. He was elected as the MLA in the 2022 Punjab Legislative Assembly election.

Political career
In 2022, Dhose successfully contested the assembly election from Dharamkot Assembly constituency defeating Sukhjit Singh Kaka Lohgarh (INC) the incumbent MLA from Dharamkot. The Aam Aadmi Party gained a strong 79% majority in the sixteenth Punjab Legislative Assembly by winning 92 out of 117 seats in the 2022 Punjab Legislative Assembly election. MP Bhagwant Mann was sworn in as Chief Minister on 16 March 2022.

Member of Legislative Assembly
He represents the Dharamkot Assembly constituency as MLA in Punjab Assembly.

Committee assignments of Punjab Legislative Assembly 
Member (2022–23) Committee on Public Accounts
 Member (2022–23) Committee on Co-operation and its allied activities

Electoral Performance

References

Living people
Punjab, India MLAs 2022–2027
Aam Aadmi Party politicians from Punjab, India
Year of birth missing (living people)